This is a List of the National Register of Historic Places listings in the Town of Babylon, New York

This list is intended to provide a comprehensive listing of entries in the National Register of Historic Places in Town of Babylon, New York.  The locations of National Register properties for which the latitude and longitude coordinates are included below, may be seen in a Google map.

Listings

|}

See also
National Register of Historic Places listings in New York
National Register of Historic Places listings in Suffolk County, New York

References

Babylon (town), New York